2018 Zweigen Kanazawa season.

J2 League

References

External links
 J.League official site

Zweigen Kanazawa
Zweigen Kanazawa seasons